Judicial corporal punishment in Afghanistan is lawful and can be carried out in public or private.

Flogging
Flogging is a lawful sentence under Shari'a law in Afghanistan for crimes such as adultery, which may be punished with 100 lashes of a whip.

Flogging may also be administered as a disciplinary measure in penal institutions.

Courts have also ordered flogging for alcohol use, although a BBC report has claimed that this is rare.

References

Corporal punishments
Penal system in Afghanistan